Ural Tansykbaevich Tansykbayev (1 January 1904, in Tashkent, Russian Empire – 18 April 1974, in Nukus, Karakalpak ASSR) was an Uzbek painter of Kazakh descent. He was named a People's Artist of the USSR and People's Artist of the Uzbek SSR in the category visual art.

Biography 

Tansykbayev attended a Russian-Uzbek school (1916) and graduated from a seven-year school in 1919. Between 1919 and 1921 he worked at a tobacco factory and at a winery.

He studied with Russian painters and followers of the Peredvizhniki ("Wanderers"), first under Nikolay Vasilyevich Rozanov (1869–1940)  his art studio of Tashkent Art Museum (now Fine Arts Museum of Uzbekistan) (1924–1928), and later in the Art and Pedagogical Technical School, Penza (1928–1929), under Ivan Silovich Goryushkin-Sorokopudov (1873–1954) and Nikolay Filippovich Petrov (1872–1941).

There he became interested in Fauvism and the work of the French Expressionist's, influences noticeable in the increased decorativeness and heightened sense of colour in his early work.

From 1929 he participated in art exhibitions. Since 1932 he had been Steering Committee Member of the Union of Artists of Uzbekistan.

In 1938 he was the stage and costumes designer of the first national Kazakh ballet  "Kalkaman and Mamir" (music of Vasily Vasilyevich Velikanov)  at the Kazakh State Theatre of Opera and Ballet in Alma-Ata, production of the First Kazakh ballerina and choreographer  Shara Zhienkulova  (1912–1991) (based on the poem "Kalkaman and Mamir" of the historian and poet Şekerim Kudayberdiulı (Shakarim Qudaiberdiulı (1858–1931), the student of Abai Kunanbaiuli).

As a member of the Uzbekistan delegation he visited the World War II frontlines in 1942. Jointly with artists M. Arinin, S. Cheprakov, and Madra Mandicencio, he made more than 30 monumental paintings for the Uzbek pavilion at All-Union Agricultural Exhibition (VSKhV) (now All-Russia Exhibition Centre) in Moscow  (1952–1955).

He was successively elected corresponding member (1954), and full member of the Academy of Arts  of the USSR (1958). That year he was awarded a silver medal at Universal Exhibition in Brussels Expo '58  (1958) ( Exposition universelle et internationale de Bruxelles, Wereldtentoonstelling Brussel 1958 (Belgium).

The theme of his early paintings is connected with the searches for expressive means, forms of reflection of the reality. They are intensive and enriched by their colours, decorative. Since the beginning of the 1950s the main genre in his art had become landscape.

Tansykbayev participated in many exhibitions in Uzbekistan, in Moscow and abroad. His art was marked by numerous governmental awards.

Awards 

Order of Lenin
Hamza State Prize of the Uzbek SSR 1973
Order of the Red Banner of Labour
 Repin State Prize of the RSFSR
Order Buyuk Hizmatlari Uchun (For Great Merits) of Uzbekistan  2001 (posthumous)

Museums 

Ural Tansykbaev Memorial Museum (Tashkent, Uzbekistan)
 was opened on 16 January 1981 by Tansykbayev's widow Yelizaveta Yakovlevna Tansykbaeva.

The center of the whole exposition is the studio of master with an easel, which holds the last, unfinished canvas. Besides the studio, the house includes the sitting-room, bedroom and study room, in which the painter loved to write sketches. On the walls of the house, visitors may watch still lifes, sketches – all at the same places as they used to be hanged while the painter was alive.

In 1994 the Exhibition Hall was built at the territory of memorial house. The Hall regularly hosts exhibitions of paintings from museum collection, works of modern painters, as well as a constant exposition of Ural Tansykbaev's canvases.

The State Tretyakov Gallery  (Moscow, Russia)   

The State Museum of Oriental Art  (Moscow, Russia)  

The State Museum of Arts of Uzbekistan  (Tashkent, Uzbekistan)

The Abylkhan Kasteev State Museum of Arts of the Republic of Kazakhstan
(Almaty, Kazakhstan)

The Igor Savitsky Karakalpakstan State Art Museum  (Nukus, Uzbekistan)

The Kokand Regional Studies Museum    (Kokand, Uzbekistan)

The Kamoliddin Behzod  Fine Arts Museum (Bukhara  State Fine Art Museum)  (Bukhara, Uzbekistan)

The Mikhail Vrubel Fine Arts Museum  (Omsk, Russia)    

The Art Gallery of the National Bank for Foreign Economic Activity of the Republic of Uzbekistan  (Tashkent, Uzbekistan)   (Rus)

The Earth Science Museum of Lomonosov Moscow University  (Moscow, Russia)
 (Rus)

College 
Tansykbaev Almaty Art College (Almaty,  Kazakhstan)

References and notes

1904 births
1974 deaths
Artists from Tashkent
People from Syr-Darya Oblast
Soviet painters
People's Artists of the USSR (visual arts)
20th-century Uzbekistani painters
Recipients of the Order of Lenin